Illawarra was an electoral district of the Legislative Assembly in the Australian state of New South Wales. It was located in the Illawarra area and originally created in 1859, replacing East Camden. It was replaced by Wollongong in 1904 and recreated in 1927. In 1968, it was abolished and partly replaced by Kembla. In 1971, Kembla was abolished and Illawarra was recreated. In 2007, it was abolished and replaced by Shellharbour.

Members for Illawarra

Election results

References

Former electoral districts of New South Wales
1859 establishments in Australia
Constituencies established in 1859
1904 disestablishments in Australia
Constituencies disestablished in 1904
1927 establishments in Australia
Constituencies established in 1927
1968 disestablishments in Australia
Constituencies disestablished in 1968
1971 establishments in Australia
Constituencies established in 1971
2007 disestablishments in Australia
Constituencies disestablished in 2007